Gerald J. O'Gara (October 11, 1902 - October 7, 1989) served in the California State Senate for the 14th district from 1947 to 1955 and a member of the San Francisco Board of Supervisors.  During World War II he served in the United States Navy.

References

External links
Join California Gerald J. O'Gara

United States Navy personnel of World War II
San Francisco Board of Supervisors members
20th-century American politicians
Democratic Party California state senators
1902 births
1989 deaths
Politicians from San Francisco